St Bartholomew's Church, Langford is a Grade I listed parish church in the Church of England in Langford, Nottinghamshire.

History

The church dates from the 13th century, and was restored in 1862.

It is part of a group of parishes which includes 
St Giles' Church, Holme
St Cecilia's Church, Girton
All Saints' Church, Harby
St George the Martyr's Church, North & South Clifton
All Saints' Church, Collingham
St John the Baptist's Church, Collingham
St Helena's Church, South Scarle
Holy Trinity Church, Besthorpe
St Helen's Church, Thorney
All Saints' Church, Winthorpe

References

Church of England church buildings in Nottinghamshire
Grade I listed churches in Nottinghamshire